Communion is the seventh studio album by Greek death metal band Septicflesh. It was released on March 17, 2008 worldwide, and March 25, 2008 in the United States, both dates through the French label Season of Mist. The album is the first since the band's split up, after the release of Sumerian Daemons in 2003, and the first to be released under the name "Septicflesh" following the band's name change.

Background and production 
Septicflesh first announced a reunion show at the Metal Healing Festival in their home-country on February 19, 2007 and shortly hereafter a new full-length on French label Season of Mist. Communion including a full classical orchestra, arranged by guitarist Christos Antoniou, who has a master's degree in concert music from the London College of Music. The Prague Filmharmonic Orchestra recorded the compositions with 80 instrumentalists and a choir of 32 singers.

Musical and lyrical themes 
Communion combines the heaviness and brutality of death metal, with the obscure atmosphere of gothic metal, along with some influences of black metal. The album features a full orchestra and choir, with more than 100 musicians — adding a classical element to the songs — led by Chris Antoniou who is responsible for the arrangements.

According to guitarist Sotiris Vayenas the album title means something like "communication with non-human entities."

The main theme of album is mythology, with elements from various ancient civilizations, including Egyptian, Hellenic and Sumerian.

Critical reception 

Communion received excellent reviews from music critics and Septicflesh's fans, with About.com reviewer Chad Bowar saying "The extreme elements of Septic Flesh are tempered with melody and contrasted nicely by the symphonic elements. The songwriting and arrangements are excellent. It's a great mix of tempos, intensities and atmospheres. From the beautiful to the brutal, Communion covers all the musical bases, and this is one of the best CDs Septic Flesh has done." Kostas Sarampalis of Chronicles of Chaos praised the album, stating "In short, Septic Flesh have come out of their coma in great shape with a fantastic album."

Track listing 
All lyrics written by Sotiris V., all music composed by Septicflesh.

Personnel

Release history

References 

2008 albums
Septicflesh albums
Season of Mist albums
Albums with cover art by Spiros Antoniou
Albums produced by Fredrik Nordström
Albums by Greek artists